Jack Francis Anthony Squire (5 May 1914 – 15 May 2000) was an English film and television screenwriter and director. He was married for a time to the actress Shelagh Fraser.

Born in London, he is best known for his work on ITC television series of the 1950s such as The Adventures of Robin Hood and William Tell.

He also worked as a second unit director in several films, in which he specialised in set pieces including the James Bond films Casino Royale (1967) and On Her Majesty's Secret Service (1969) (the stock-car sequence) and Darling Lili (aerial sequences).

Selected filmography
 Files from Scotland Yard (1951)

External links
Profile at the British Film Institute

1914 births
2000 deaths
British male screenwriters
British television directors
Writers from London
20th-century British screenwriters